Thomas Nathan Hateley (born 12 September 1989) is an English professional footballer who plays as a defensive midfielder for Ekstraklasa side Piast Gliwice.

Background
His father Mark played for many clubs including Coventry City, Portsmouth, A.C. Milan, Rangers and AS Monaco. Tom was born in Monaco.

His late grandfather, Tony, was also an English striker who played for many clubs including Notts County, Chelsea, Aston Villa, Birmingham City and Liverpool.

His father revealed in his Daily Record columns that he used to take Tom to Rangers dressing room before matches and used to warm up with goalkeeper Andy Goram when he was five years old. While growing up, Tom was a Rangers fan.

Career

Reading
Hateley began his career at Reading, helping the reserve team to the national league title in the 2006–07 season. He was also the captain of the under-18 side during his time with the Royals. In the aftermath of the departure of Steve Coppell, he was one of several youngsters to be released by Reading in the summer of 2009. After being released by Reading, and after time at Basingstoke, Hateley had an extremely successful 4 years at Motherwell.

Loan to Basingstoke Town
In late 2008, he joined Basingstoke Town on loan until the end of the season and featured in an FA Cup match against Bury Town. He made fifteen appearances in all for the Hampshire club. During that season, he also had a trial at Hamilton Academical. He almost signed on loan, but Manager Billy Reid decided against bringing him in due to a short spell of ill health at the time of trial.

Motherwell
After being released by Reading, Hateley featured in a pre-season friendly for Basingstoke against Carshalton Athletic. He went on trial at Aldershot Town before being offered a trial with Scottish Premier League club Motherwell. Manager Jim Gannon offered the youngster a twelve-month deal with the option of a further year. He joined Motherwell on 13 August 2009, on a one-year contract. Set to start on the bench against St Johnstone, Hateley made his league debut unexpectedly as a late replacement for Paul Slane in a 2–2 draw. Hateley became an integral part of the Motherwell midfield during the 2009–10 season, offering additional defensive cover when required. He scored his first Motherwell goal with a free-kick against his father's former club Rangers in February 2010. After the match, Hateley said scoring against Rangers was the best goal of his career and that his dad even congratulated him. At the end of the season, he signed a new three-year contract, running until 2013.

In the 2010–11 season, Hateley made his European debut, in the first round first leg of the Europa League campaign, in a 1–0 win over Breiðablik. Then in the second leg, Hateley provided an assist for Jamie Murphy to send the club through to the next round. In the first leg of the play-off round, Hateley scored his first European goal, in a 2–1 loss against Danish side OB. After scoring his first European goal, Hateley described it as a "perfect moment". But in the second leg, Motherwell were eliminated after losing 1–0. Later in the season, Hateley scored twice in the league, against St Mirren and Hearts. Hateley was also in the starting line-up for the Scottish Cup final against Celtic, but Motherwell lost 3–0. After the match, he said the match had left him lost for words. At the conclusion of the 2010–11 season, Hateley had scored three goals in fifty-three appearances.

In the 2011–12 season, Hateley scored four goals in all competitions in forty-three appearances. In the 2012–13 season, Hateley made his Champions League debut, in a 3–0 loss against Greek side Panathinaikos. He played in both legs of the Champions League match. His contract talks with Motherwell soon broke down as he continued to be linked with many European clubs.

On 27 June 2013, Hateley left Motherwell after informing manager Stuart McCall that he would not return for pre-season training. This would end his four-year association with the club. In the summer transfer window, Hateley was linked a move back to Motherwell, something that was denied by McCall.

Tranmere Rovers
On 21 September 2013, Hateley moved to England by joining League One Tranmere Rovers on a 4-month contract.

He made his debut on the same day for the club in a 2–0 loss away at Notts County, he played the full 90 minutes whilst picking up a yellow card in the process. Four days later, he made his next appearance in the third round of the League Cup against Stoke City and despite losing 2–0, Hateley, along with three defenders, "delivered solid displays in defence". Hateley then played in central midfield, before a spell out of the team through injury.

After four months, Hateley left the club at the end of his contract.

Śląsk Wrocław
On 23 January 2014, Hateley left Tranmere Rovers to move abroad by joining Polish side Śląsk Wrocław on a two-and-a-half-year contract despite interest from Partick Thistle. Hateley had previously gone on trial with the club, which went successfully. Upon the move, he revealed his former Motherwell teammate Henrik Ojamaa had recommended he should move to Poland.

Hateley made his Ekstraklasa debut on 16 February 2014, in an away match against Lech Poznań.

Dundee
Hateley signed a two-year contract with Dundee on 5 September 2016. Before joining the club, he had also spoken to Partick Thistle and Hibernian.

On 31 August 2017, Hateley was released from his contract by mutual consent.

Career statistics

Honours
Piast Gliwice
Ekstraklasa: 2018–19

References

External links

1989 births
People from Monte Carlo
Monegasque footballers
Monegasque expatriate footballers
Monegasque people of English descent
Monegasque emigrants to the United Kingdom
Living people
English footballers
English expatriate footballers
Association football midfielders
Reading F.C. players
Basingstoke Town F.C. players
Motherwell F.C. players
Tranmere Rovers F.C. players
Śląsk Wrocław players
Dundee F.C. players
Scottish Premier League players
English Football League players
National League (English football) players
Piast Gliwice players
Ekstraklasa players
AEK Larnaca FC players
English expatriate sportspeople in Poland
English expatriate sportspeople in Cyprus
Expatriate footballers in Poland
Expatriate footballers in Cyprus
Scottish Professional Football League players